Yeak Laom is a commune (khum) in the Banlung Municipality of the Ratanakiri Province in northeastern Cambodia. It has a population of 1,855.

NGOs reported that much of the leased area may be eligible for registration as indigenous community land under the 2001 law. The affected indigenous communities were not involved in lease negotiations.

Villages

References

Communes of Ratanakiri province